Andrei Ionuț Boroştean (born 25 February 1987) is a Romanian former footballer who played as a midfielder for CFR Cluj, Unirea Dej, FC Botoşani, Săgeata Năvodari, Arieşul Turda, FC Hunedoara and Seso Câmpia Turzii.

External links
 
 

1987 births
Living people
Sportspeople from Cluj-Napoca
Romanian footballers
Association football midfielders
Liga I players
Liga II players
CFR Cluj players
FC Botoșani players
AFC Săgeata Năvodari players
ACS Sticla Arieșul Turda players
CS Corvinul Hunedoara players
CSM Câmpia Turzii players
FC Unirea Dej players